African Blues is an album by the Malian musician Ali Farka Touré, released in 1990. It was originally released by French label Sonodisc.

Critical reception

Trouser Press wrote: "The blunt, lonesome vocals echo the plainspoken manner of Delta storytellers, but the forms are less familiar: many of the selections are built on droning single chords that become enchanting through repetition." The Chicago Tribune stated that "Toure's sound and style are testaments to his love for the Delta bluesmen and the influences he shares with them: the ability to weave a good story with emotional guitar accompaniment."

Track listing
 "Sidy Gouro" – 3:45
 "Okatagouna" – 4:22
 "Devele Wague" – 5:59
 "N'Timbara" – 3:58
 "Zona" – 7:45
 "Mbaudy" – 8:52
 "Petenere" – 4:50
 "L'Exode" – 5:21

Personnel
 Ali Farka Touré (Vocals 1–8, Guitar 1-8)
 Hammer Sankare (Vocals 1–4, Calabash 1-4)
 Boubacar Hamadoun Farana (Griot 5-8)
 Ousmane Gadjaka (n'goni 5-8)

References

External links
 African Blues

Ali Farka Touré albums
1990 albums